Pogonowski is a Polish-language  family name. Feminine form: Pogonowska. The surname may refer to:

Iwo Cyprian Pogonowski (born 1921)
Stefan Pogonowski (1895–1920)
Maria Pogonowska (1897–2009)
 (1922–2005), Polish poet
 (1939–2004), Polish lawyer and statesperson, member of parliament and State Tribunal
 (1958), Polish informatics teacher and mathematician

Polish-language surnames